Francisco Javier Bahamondes Galea (born 7 April 1988) is a Chilean who currently plays for San Luis as left back.

References

External links
 

1988 births
Living people
Chilean footballers
Primera B de Chile players
Chilean Primera División players
Unión La Calera footballers
Everton de Viña del Mar footballers
Deportes Iquique footballers
Rangers de Talca footballers
San Marcos de Arica footballers
Unión San Felipe footballers
San Luis de Quillota footballers
Association football fullbacks